"Power and the Passion" is the second single from Midnight Oil's 1982 album 10, 9, 8, 7, 6, 5, 4, 3, 2, 1 (following "US Forces"). The song is one of the band's most famous, and it was performed on every Midnight Oil tour since the issue of 10, 9, 8, 7, 6, 5, 4, 3, 2, 1 as well as at the WaveAid concert.

At the 1983 Countdown Music Awards, the song won Best Australian Single.

In January 2018, as part of Triple M's "Ozzest 100", the 'most Australian' songs of all time, "Power and the Passion" was ranked number 29.

Lyrics and composition
The lyrics mention former Australian prime minister Gough Whitlam and his dismissal in 1975, as well as the Pine Gap spy base, which remain controversial issues in Australia to this day. The song also makes reference to the McDonald's Big Mac and paraphrases Emiliano Zapata with the line "It's better to die on your feet than to live on your knees."

The song includes a drum solo by Rob Hirst; it is the only studio recording by Midnight Oil to feature a drum solo.

Legacy
In May 2001 the Australasian Performing Right Association (APRA), as part of its 75th Anniversary celebrations, named "Power and the Passion" as one of the Top 30 Australian songs of all time. It was the second Midnight Oil song in the list with "Beds Are Burning" declared third behind the Easybeats' "Friday on My Mind" and Daddy Cool's "Eagle Rock".

It was performed by the band at the 2009 Sound Relief concert in Melbourne.

On 5 June 2012, the song was released  as downloadable content for the video game Rock Band 3.

Music video
The video for "Power and the Passion" was filmed in 1982 amongst the "Woolloomooloo Mural Project" in Sydney, NSW, Australia.

Track listing
 "Power and the Passion" - 4:45
 "Power and the Passion" (Dub Version) - 4:39

Compilations
This track was placed on the band's collection 20,000 Watt R.S.L.

More recently, the title of the collection Flat Chat was derived from the lyrics of this song. However, this song was not featured on that collection.

A newly remastered version was then featured on the band's second "greatest hits" album, Essential Oils (Midnight Oil album), in 2012.

US 12-inch version
The US 12-inch single release features a little-known specially remixed version, mixed by Francois Kevorkian and Dominic Malta at RPM Sound Studios specifically for the North American market. This special version, titled "Glitch Baby Glitch", did not appear on the 12-inch single as released elsewhere in the world, including in Australia, whose 12-inch single featured the standard album version which runs for 5:38. The remix features echo effects added to Peter Garrett's vocals and a continuation or reprise of Rob Hirst's drum solo after the nominal ending of the song.

Live versions
Live versions of "Power and the Passion" were not available legally until 2004, when the Best of Both Worlds CD/two-DVD set featured two. One (on the Oils on the Water CD/DVD) was from early 1985 (the Red Sails in the Sunset tour) and the other (on the Saturday Night at the Capitol DVD) was from 1982 ( the 10, 9, 8, 7, 6, 5, 4, 3, 2, 1 tour).

The song's drum solo was often performed significantly faster.

Personnel
 Peter Garrett - lead vocals
 Peter Gifford - bass, backup vocals 
 Martin Rotsey - guitar
 Jim Moginie - guitar, keyboards
 Rob Hirst - drums, percussion

with
 Gary Barnacle, Peter Thoms, Luke Tunney - brass

Charts

Weekly charts

Year-end charts

References

1983 singles
APRA Award winners
Midnight Oil songs
1982 songs
Columbia Records singles
Song recordings produced by Nick Launay
Songs written by Jim Moginie
Songs written by Peter Garrett
Songs written by Martin Rotsey